Mikrakh is a rural locality (a selo) and the administrative centre of Mikrakhsky Selsoviet, Dokuzparinsky District, Republic of Dagestan, Russia. The population was 1,259 as of 2010. There are 4 streets.

Nationalities 
Lezgins live there.

Geography
Mikrakh is located 8 km southwest of Usukhchay (the district's administrative centre) by road. Kaladzhukh and Kiler are the nearest rural localities.

References 

Rural localities in Dokuzparinsky District